Jean Kambanda (born October 19, 1955) is a Rwandan former politician who served as the Prime Minister of Rwanda in the caretaker government from the start of the 1994 Rwandan genocide. He is the only head of government to plead guilty to genocide, in the first group of such convictions since the Convention on the Prevention and Punishment of the Crime of Genocide came into effect in 1951.

Kambanda holds a degree in commercial engineering and began his career as a low-level United Popular BPR banker, rising as a technocrat to become the chair of the bank. At the time of the April 1994 crisis he was vice president of the Butare section of the opposition Republican Democratic Movement (MDR).

He was sworn in as prime minister on April 9, 1994 after the president Juvénal Habyarimana and prime minister Agathe Uwilingiyimana, were both assassinated. He remained in the post for the hundred days of the genocide until July 19, 1994. After leaving office he fled the country.

Criminal responsibility
Kambanda was arrested in Nairobi on July 18, 1997, after a seven-week multinational stakeout and transferred to the International Criminal Tribunal for Rwanda. The court accused him of distributing small arms and ammunition in Butare and Gitarama with the knowledge that they would be used to massacre civilians. He was found guilty after pleading guilty, a plea he later rescinded, but which rescission the Court did not accept.

On September 4, 1998, the ICTR condemned Jean Kambanda to life imprisonment for:
Genocide, and Agreement to commit genocide
Incitement to genocide
Aiding and abetting genocide
Failing in his duty to prevent the genocide which occurred while he was prime minister
Two counts of crimes against humanity

Joy Mukanyange, the Rwandan Ambassador to Tanzania, was the only Rwandan official who attended the sentencing. She thought it was fair that Kambanda received a life sentence and his crimes had been recognized by the international community. She noted that Rwanda was "not looking for revenge".

This verdict was upheld by the ICTR Appeal Chamber on October 19, 2000, and Kambanda is currently jailed in Koulikoro Prison in Mali.

Blaming the army 

Although Kambanda pleaded guilty after receiving legal counsel, his lawyer argued that the prime minister was a "puppet" of the military, who had dragged him from his bank, after killing the previous prime minister, to legitimize their control of their country. He asked the ICTR for a sentence of two years because he acted "under duress with limited responsibility".

The court concluded that this defense against a charge of genocide was irrelevant.

In 2006 he testified for the defence of Colonel Theoneste Bagosora in the 'Military 1' trial of senior military leaders. That testimony was the former Prime Minister's first and only public testimony on the 1994 events in Rwanda and in which he said that he had never found a plan to commit genocide. The decisions of the ICTR regarding Kambanda have been subject to criticism.

Responsible but not guilty 

In his appeal, Kambanda said that his confession had been in error, due to poor or misunderstood counsel. He said that his objective was not to plead guilty but to tell the truth. According to the ICTR appeal:
 "Kambanda noted that while he felt politically responsible for what happened, he did not feel guilty at the time and does not feel guilty now."

Legal legacy 
As a head of government convicted by an international court, Kambanda is an important figure, with the verdict against him forming a precedent against the legal principle of State Immunity (which was used to reject an extradition order for Augusto Pinochet, for example).

References

External links 

 The BBC story on Kambanda's testimony on the organization of the genocide, which forms an important source document for Linda Melvern's book Conspiracy to Murder: The Rwanda Genocide and the International Community (2004) Verso 
 The ICTR official transcript of the sentencing phase, including Mr. Jean Kambanda's acknowledgement of his original guilty plea.
 Commentary from the Center for International Human Rights on the Kambanda case, concerned that the former prime minister and his fellow accused were 'ordinary men'. Although admitted crimes of action and inaction are cited, the commentary notes that Kambanda and Jean-Paul Akayesu (his fellow accused) were "Pillars of their communities". It concludes:
 "Of what are ordinary human beings capable -- be it in Rwanda, Bosnia, Cambodia, El Salvador or elsewhere? Who is capable of genocide? And who is not?"
 Judgment and Sentence of Jean Kambanda 
 The Sacrifice of Jean Kambanda is a detailed account of the Kambanda trial and the politics & jurisprudence of ICTR, written by the California Western School of Law (2004).
The thesis is that Kambanda's conviction was accelerated to bolster confidence and support of the court within Rwanda. The principal charge against the workings of the International Criminal Tribunal for Rwanda is that Kambanda's right to counsel was overridden.
Although he was able to select his own choice of lawyer from a screened list, the court's Registrar held the final say. Not only was his attorney chosen by the court that was prosecuting him, the registrar is officially required to select a counsel 'prudently' with regard to their cost, and French and Canadian lawyers were initially excluded from the list (despite these countries supplying the majority of qualified French speakers who have passed the ICTR bar).
Kambanda's decision to defend himself for four months was scarcely recorded in the court's proceedings, and when he opted for counsel, the first act of the counsellor (who is characterized as 'inept') was to sign a confession to the prosecution's case. This analysis concludes that the appeal was strategically flawed, and that the probable reason for the legal "carelessness" was that Kambanda was the face of genocide in Kigali; no more time could be wasted before he was given the court's most severe punishment, without recourse to appeal.
Ultimately, the critique is not on the grounds of justice (Kambanda was certainly guilty), but concern that the court ultimately produced a show trial, since his appeal may not have been thrown out by the U.S. courts.
 The International War Crimes Tribunal for Rwanda (ICTR) pressroom report on the Kambanda appeal - in which, among other things, the reasoning of incompetent representation and the credibility of a mistaken confession are rejected.

1955 births
Living people
People from Southern Province, Rwanda
Hutu people
Republican Democratic Movement politicians
Prime Ministers of Rwanda
People convicted by the International Criminal Tribunal for Rwanda
Rwandan people convicted of genocide
Rwandan people convicted of crimes against humanity
Rwandan people imprisoned abroad
Prisoners and detainees of Mali
Rwandan prisoners sentenced to life imprisonment
Prisoners sentenced to life imprisonment by international courts and tribunals
People extradited from Kenya
Rwandan politicians convicted of crimes
People convicted of incitement to genocide